"...(And That's No Lie)" is a song by the British new wave and synth-pop band Heaven 17, which was released in 1985 as the third single from their third studio album How Men Are. The song was written by Glenn Gregory, Ian Craig Marsh and Martyn Ware, and produced by Ware and Greg Walsh. It reached number 52 in the UK Singles Chart and remained in the top 100 for five weeks. A music video was filmed to promote the single.

In the UK, the 12-inch single was issued in five different sleeves. All track listings were the same, except on the fifth and final 12-inch variation, which contains the exclusive "The Heaven 17 Megamix". It features extracts of "This Is Mine", "Crushed by the Wheels of Industry", "The Height of the Fighting (He-La-Hu)", "Penthouse and Pavement", "Temptation", "I'm Your Money" and "Play to Win".

Critical reception
On its release as a single, Martin Townsend of Number One picked "...(And That's No Lie)" as joint "single of the week" and predicted it would be a minor hit. He considered it to be "a densely melodic 7-inch and a truly awesome ten-minute ride on the 12-inch". Mike Gardiner of Record Mirror felt it was "another disappointing release from a group who should know better". He compared the song to "looking at a construction site" which is "messy, noisy, a lot of activity but the building's only half complete". Danny Kelly of New Musical Express commented, "This highlights the oft forgotten melodic strengths of Heaven 17 but are we really expected to get excited about a three minute edit from a ten minute track, the fourth A side from a non too thrilling LP?" He questioned how successful the single would be in the charts, but noted the "nice sleeve".

DJ Mark Hollis, writing for the Daily Mirror stated, "Heaven 17 disappointed me with this on first hearing. Maybe a few plays will change that." Frank Edmonds of the Bury Free Press gave the song a 5 out of 10 rating and wrote, "After two great singles this is pretty damn boring." In a retrospective review of How Men Are, Aaron Badgley of AllMusic picked the song as a "highlight", describing it as "very long but very wonderful". He noted the "strong melody", "stunning vocals" and "tight production".

Formats and track listings
7-inch single
 "...(And That's No Lie)" - 3:25
 "The Fuse" - 3:53

12-inch single
 "...(And That's No Lie)" (Re-mixed To Enhance Its Danceability) - 6:10
 "The Fuse" (L.P. version) - 3:05
 "...(And That's No Lie)" (L.P. version) - 10:02

12-inch single (UK 5/5 release)
 "...(And That's No Lie)" (Re-mixed To Enhance Its Danceability) - 6:10
 "The Fuse" (L.P. version) - 3:05
 "The Heaven 17 Megamix" - 8:28

Personnel
Heaven 17
 Glenn Gregory - lead vocals, backing vocals
 Martyn Ware - LinnDrum programming, backing vocals, producer
 Ian Craig Marsh - synthesizer

Additional personnel
 Greg Walsh - producer
 Sanny X - remixer of "The Heaven 17 Megamix"

Charts

References

1984 songs
1985 singles
Heaven 17 songs
Songs written by Martyn Ware
Songs written by Glenn Gregory
Songs written by Ian Craig Marsh
Virgin Records singles